Melilotus officinalis, known as sweet yellow clover, yellow melilot, ribbed melilot and common melilot, is a species of legume native to Eurasia and introduced in North America, Africa, and Australia.

Description

Leaves alternate on the stem and possess three leaflets. Yellow flowers bloom in spring and summer and produce fruit in pods typically containing one seed. Seeds can be viable for up to 30 years. Plants have large taproots and tend to grow in groups. Plants have a characteristic sweet odor.

Habitat
M. officinalis is native to Europe and Asia and has been introduced to North America as a forage crop. It commonly grows in calcareous loamy and clay soils with a pH above 6.5 and can tolerate cold temperatures and drought; it does not tolerate standing water or acidic soils, with a pH of 5.5 as the plant's lowest limit. Common places where it can be found include open disturbed land, prairies, and savannahs, and it grows in full or partial sunlight. It is an invasive species in areas where it has been introduced, especially in open grasslands and woodlands where it shades and outcompetes native plant species.

Toxicology
Sweet clover contains coumarin that converts to dicoumarol, which is a powerful anticoagulant toxin, when the plant becomes moldy. This can lead to bleeding diseases (internal hemorrhaging) and death in cattle. Consequently, hay containing the plant must be properly dried and cured, especially in wet environments.

Uses
The seeds are eaten by game birds, including grouse.

Sweetclover can be used as pasture or livestock feed when properly cured. It is most palatable in spring and early summer, but livestock may need time to adjust to the bitter taste of coumarin in the plant. Prior to World War II, before the common use of commercial agricultural fertilizers, the plant was commonly used as a cover crop to increase nitrogen content and improve subsoil water capacity in poor soils. It is the most drought-tolerant of the commercially available legumes. Sweet clover is a major source of nectar for domestic honey bees as hives near sweetclover can yield up to 200 pounds of honey in a year.

Sweetclover has been used as a phytoremediation—phytodegradation plant for treatment of soils contaminated with dioxins.

In the chemical industry, dicoumarol is extracted from the plant to produce rodenticides.

Management
When M. officinalis is invasive, it can be managed by mulching, hand-pulling, mowing, or herbicide applications such (e.g., 2,4-D) before flowering. Prescribed burns in late fall or early spring followed by another burn in late spring can reduce the number of plants before seed set.

References 

Trifolieae
Flora of Asia
Flora of Europe
Phytoremediation plants
Medicinal plants